A Ridin' Romeo is a 1921 American silent Western film directed by George Marshall and starring Tom Mix, Rhea Mitchell and Eugenie Forde.

Cast
 Tom Mix as Jim Rose
 Rhea Mitchell as Mabel Brentwood
 Pat Chrisman as Highlow, the Indian
 Sid Jordan as Jack Walters
 Harry Dunkinson as King Brentwood
 Eugenie Forde as Queenie Farrell
 Minnie Devereaux as Squaw

References

Bibliography
 Connelly, Robert B. The Silents: Silent Feature Films, 1910-36, Volume 40, Issue 2. December Press, 1998.
 Munden, Kenneth White. The American Film Institute Catalog of Motion Pictures Produced in the United States, Part 1. University of California Press, 1997.
 Solomon, Aubrey. The Fox Film Corporation, 1915-1935: A History and Filmography. McFarland, 2011.

External links
 

1921 films
1921 Western (genre) films
American silent feature films
American Western (genre) films
American black-and-white films
Fox Film films
Films directed by George Marshall
1920s English-language films
1920s American films